Woodrow is an English given name which was originally an English surname which may originally derive from a toponym meaning "row of houses by a wood" in Old English. Other sources suggest the name directly derives from woodroe ("the border hedge"), an appellation for a border guard. Other sources suggest that the name is a variant of wood+reeve, a local official, thus a forest keeper or guardian. The name was made popular, in part, by US president Woodrow Wilson, whose mother's maiden name was Woodrow.

The pet form of Woodrow is Woody.

People with the name Woodrow

Given name

People with the given name Woodrow include: 
 Woodrow A. Abbott (1919–1994), United States Air Force officer who served as director of intelligence, J-2, and inspector general of the U.S. Readiness Command, which was then headquartered at MacDill Air Force Base
 Woodrow Adams (1917–1988), American Delta blues guitarist and harmonica player
 Woodrow Borah (1912–1999), U.S. historian of colonial Mexico, whose research contributions on demography, economics, and social structure made him a major Latin Americanist
 Woodrow Chambliss (1914–1981), American character actor who appeared in both feature films and television
 Woodrow Hamilton (born 1992), American football defensive tackle for the Carolina Panthers of the National Football League (NFL). He played college football at Ole Miss
 Woodrow W. Jones (1914–2002), United States Representative from North Carolina and a United States District Judge of the United States District Court for the Western District of North Carolina
 Woodrow Lawrence, swimmer at the 1996 Summer Olympics in Atlanta for his country of birth Dominica. Woody finished 60th out of 63 competitors in 50 meter freestyle, with a time of 27.88 seconds
 Woodrow Lloyd (1913–1972), Canadian politician and educator
 Woodrow Wilson Mann (1916–2002), American politician who was the mayor of the capital city of Little Rock, Arkansas, from 1956 to 1957
 Woodrow M. Melvin (1912–1994), American politician in the state of Florida.
 Woodrow Phoenix, British comics artist, writer, editorial illustrator, graphic designer, font designer and author of children's books
 Woodrow Bradley Seals (1917–1990), United States District Judge of the United States District Court for the Southern District of Texas
 Woodrow Stanley (1950–2022), American politician, Democratic Party politician, is a former member of the Michigan House of Representatives from the 34th District. He was a former mayor of Flint, until he was recalled from office in 2002
 Woodrow Swancutt (1915–1993), major general in the United States Air Force
 Woodrow West (born 1985), Belizean professional footballer who plays as a goalkeeper for Honduras Progreso
 Woodrow Whitlow Jr., associate administrator for Mission Support at NASA. He was appointed to this position by NASA administrator Charles Bolden on February 3, 2010. Prior to this, he was director of the NASA Glenn Research Center in Cleveland Ohio
 Woodrow Wilson (1856–1924), 28th president of the United States from 1913 to 1921
 Woodrow Wilson (disambiguation), various people

With nickname Woody

 Woody Guthrie (Woodrow Wilson Guthrie, 1912–1967), US musician
 Woody Hayes (Wayne Woodrow Hayes, 1913–1987), US football coach
 Woody Harrelson (Woodrow Tracy Harrelson, 1961- ), US television actor

Surname

People with the surname Woodrow include:
 Alan Woodrow (born 1952), Canadian opera singer
 Allan Woodrow (disambiguation), various people
 Bill Woodrow (born 1948), British sculptor
 Cauley Woodrow (born 1994), English professional footballer who plays as a forward for League One club Barnsley. He made his debut in the Football League for Southend United in September 2013
 George Marshall Woodrow (1846–1911), British botanist
 Herbert Woodrow (1883–1974), American psychologist. He served as president of the American Psychological Association in 1941 and was a faculty member at several universities. He was a first cousin of Woodrow Wilson
 James Woodrow (disambiguation), multiple people
 Joash Woodrow (1927–2006), reclusive English artist
 John Woodrow (1919–1988), British Army officer
 Julian Woodrow (born 1996), American singer and songwriter. He is half of the duo "Take 2" (formerly known as "Blackberry Jam"), along with his brother Adrian Chirtea
 Keith Woodrow (1927–1997), Scottish native who rose from being a former constable in Argyllshire in 1954 to Senior Superintendent of the colonial Royal Hong Kong Police Force at the time of his retirement in 1975
 Luke Woodrow (1921–2000), Roman Catholic priest, realtor and politician in Newfoundland. He represented Bay of Islands in the Newfoundland House of Assembly from 1975 to 1985
 Mark Woodrow (born 1980), English rugby union player-coach for Dings Crusaders currently playing in the English National League 3 South West
 Ralph Woodrow, Evangelical Christian minister, speaker, and author
 Steven Woodrow, American politician

Fictional characters

Fictional characters named Woodrow include:
 Woody Boyd (Woodrow Huckleberry Tiberius Boyd), character on Cheers, played by Woody Harrelson
Captain Woodrow F. Call, Texas Rangers. Main character in Larry McMurtry's Lonesome Dove, played by Tommy Lee Jones in the TV miniseries.
 Woodrow, a Simon Kidgits character developed by Simon Brand Ventures
 Woodrow Wilson Smith (Lazarus Long) "Time Enough for Love" by Robert A Heinlein. 

English given names
Masculine given names
English-language surnames
English masculine given names
English toponymic surnames